Fantasoft was a computer game company which programmed and promoted a number of shareware games with a primary focus on the Apple Macintosh platform. Fantasoft has been dormant since about 2005. It was founded by Sean Sayrs, Peter Hagen, and Tim Phillips. Fantasoft was created to develop, market, and distribute the shareware game Realmz, which was MacUser Shareware Game of the Year in 1995–96. Following the success of Realmz, Fantasoft created or marketed other Macintosh and Microsoft Windows platform games, most notably Spiderweb Software's early Exile series.  

Developed:
Realmz
Final Star (canceled)
New Centurions

Published:
 Enigma Software:
 Squish
 Peregrine (canceled)
 Spiderweb Software
 Exile: Escape from the Pit
 Exile II: Crystal Souls
 Exile III: Ruined World
 Flying Mikros Interactive
 Monkey Shines
 Monkey Shines 2: Gorilla Warfare
 Alien Attack
 Jelly Software:
 DOWN
 Freemen Software:
 King of Parking
 Rain'Net
 Bugs Bannis
 The Alchemist Guild
 Lance (canceled)
 Coach Potato Software
 CommishWare 99

Notes 
 Realmz review, Brian Rumsey, (Low End Mac Gaming), July 11, 2000
 Rlmz.org Download and Play Realmz by Fantasoft

External links 
 Fantasoft Games website
Video game companies of the United States